Chancho en Piedra is a Chilean funk rock band, considered influential in the popularization of alternative rock in Latin America. They are commonly described as similar to the Red Hot Chili Peppers, but are also known for their unique sound and goofy style. Their participation in community related events - playing benefits for the Chilean National Commission of Scientific and Technological Investigation and contributing songs to the popular Chilean children's puppet show 31 Minutos - and their proliferation as artists - having released 11 albums since their debut in 1995 - has gained them widespread familiarity. Their popularity has spread not only in Latin America but internationally as well, allowing them to perform at Memphis' Beale Street Music Festival in May 2009.

Discography

Studio albums 
Peor es mascar lauchas (1995)
 La dieta del lagarto (1997).
 Ríndanse terrícolas (1998)
 Marca Chancho (2000)
 El tinto elemento (2002)
 Chancho 6 (CD & DVD) (2004)
 Desde el Batiscafo (2005)
 Grandes éxitos de ayer y oink! (2007)
 Grandes videos de ayer y oink!(DVD) (2008)
 Cantata Rock Santa Maria De Iquique (2009)
 Combo Show (2009)
 Otra cosa es con guitarra (2011)
 Funkybarítico, Hedónico, Fantástico (2016)

Compilation albums 
Grandes éxitos de ayer y oink! (2007) 
Grandes videos de ayer y oink! (2008)

References

Chilean rock music groups